Ticket to Paradise is a 1961 British romance film directed by Francis Searle and starring Emrys Jones, Patricia Dainton and Vanda Hudson.

The film was made as a second feature for release on a double bill. It was shot at Walton Studios with sets designed by the art director Duncan Sutherland. The film is set in a fictitious Italian resort with the unlikely name of Palmos.

Cast
 Emrys Jones as Jack Watson 
 Patricia Dainton as Mary Rillston 
 Vanda Hudson as Gina 
 Denis Shaw as Giuseppe 
 Claire Gordon as Sybil 
 Maureen Davis as Betty 
 Raymond Rollett as Higginbottom 
 Gretchen Franklin as Mrs. Higginbottom 
 Sheila Bernette as Clarice 
 Carlo Borelli as Batistano 
 Nora Gordon as Mrs. Withers 
 Geoffrey Denton as Baker

References

Bibliography
 Denis Gifford. British Film Catalogue, Volume I. Routledge, 2016.

External links

1961 films
British romance films
1960s romance films
Films set in Italy
Films directed by Francis Searle
Films shot at Nettlefold Studios
1960s English-language films
1960s British films